In automotive engineering, a mid-engine layout describes the placement of an automobile engine in front of the rear-wheel axles, but behind the front axle.

History
The mid-engine, rear-wheel-drive format can be considered the original layout of automobiles. A 1901 Autocar was the first gasoline-powered automobile to use a drive shaft and placed the engine under the seat. This pioneering vehicle is now in the collection of the Smithsonian Institution.

Benefits

Mounting the engine in the middle instead of the front of the vehicle puts more weight over the rear tires, so they have more traction and provide more assistance to the front tires in braking the vehicle, with less chance of rear-wheel lockup and less chance of a skid or spin out. If the mid-engine vehicle is also rear-drive the added weight on the rear tires can also improve acceleration on slippery surfaces, providing much of the benefit of all-wheel-drive without the added weight and expense of all-wheel-drive components. The mid-engine layout makes ABS brakes and traction control systems work better, by providing them more traction to control. The mid-engine layout may make a vehicle safer since an accident can occur if a vehicle cannot stay in its own lane around a curve or is unable to stop quickly enough. Mid-engine design is also a way to provide additional empty crush space in the front of the automobile between the bumper and the windshield, which can then be designed to absorb more of the impact force in a frontal collision in order to minimize penetration into the passenger compartment of the vehicle.

In most automobiles, and in sports cars especially, ideal car handling requires balanced traction between the front and rear wheels when cornering, in order to maximize the possible speed around curves without sliding out. This balance is harder to achieve when the heavy weight of the engine is located far to the front or far to the rear of the vehicle. Some automobile designs strive to balance the fore and aft weight distribution by other means, such as putting the engine in the front and the gearbox and battery in the rear of the vehicle.

Another benefit comes when the heavy mass of the engine is located close to the back of the seats. It makes it easier for the suspension to absorb the force of bumps so the riders feel a smoother ride. But in sports cars, the engine position is once again used to increase performance and the potentially smoother ride is usually more than offset by stiffer shock absorbers.

This layout also allows the motor, gearbox, and differential to be bolted together as a single unit. Together with independent suspension on the driven wheels, this removes the need for the chassis to transfer engine torque reaction.

Drawbacks

The largest drawback of mid-engine cars is restricted rear passenger space; consequently, most mid-engine vehicles are two-seat vehicles.  The engine in effect pushes the rear passenger seats forward towards the front axle (if the engine is behind the driver). Exceptions typically involve larger vehicles of unusual length or height in which the passengers can share space between the axles with the engine, which can be between them or below them, as in some vans, large trucks, and buses. The mid-engine layout (with a horizontal engine) was common in single-decker buses in the 1950s and 1960s, e.g. the AEC Reliance. The Ferrari Mondial is to date the only successful example of a true mid-engined convertible with seating for 4 and sports car/supercar performance.  A version of the Lotus Evora with a removable roof panel is anticipated but no definite date is known.

Like any layout where the engine is not front-mounted and facing the wind, the traditional "engine-behind-the-passengers" layout makes engine cooling more difficult.  This has been a problem in some cars, but this issue seems to have been largely solved in newer designs. For example, the Saleen S7 employs large engine-compartment vents on the sides and rear of the bodywork to help dissipate heat from its very high-output engine.

Mid-engined cars are more dangerous than front-engined cars if the driver loses control - although this may be initially harder to provoke due to the superior balance - and the car begins to spin.  The moment of inertia about the center of gravity is low due to the concentration of mass between the axles (similar to standing in the middle of a playground roundabout, rather than at the edge) and the spin will occur suddenly, the car will rotate faster and it will be harder to recover from.  Conversely, a front-engined car is more likely to break away in a progressive and controllable manner as the tires lose traction.

Variations
Super, sport, and race cars frequently have a mid-engined layout, as these vehicles' handling characteristics are more important than other requirements, such as usable space. In dedicated sports cars, a weight distribution of about 50% front and rear is frequently pursued, to optimise the vehicle's driving dynamics – a target that is typically only achievable by placing the engine somewhere between the front and rear axles. Usually, the term "mid-engine" has been primarily applied to cars having the engine located between the driver and the rear drive axles. This layout is referred to as rear mid-engine, rear-wheel drive, (or RMR) layout. The mechanical layout and packaging of an RMR car are substantially different from that of a front-engine or rear-engine car.

When the engine is in front of the driver, but fully behind the front axle line, the layout is sometimes called a front mid-engine, rear-wheel-drive, or FMR layout instead of the less-specific term front-engine; and can be considered a subset of the latter. In-vehicle layout, FMR is substantially the same as FR, but handling differs as a result of the difference in weight distribution. 

Some vehicles could be classified as FR or FMR depending on the factory-installed engine (I4 vs I6).  Historically most classical FR cars such as the Ford Models T and A would qualify as an FMR engine car.  Additionally, the distinction between FR and FMR is a fluid one, depending on the degree of engine protrusion in front of the front axle line, as manufacturers mount engines as far back in the chassis as possible.  Not all manufacturers use the Front-Mid designation.

Examples

FMR layout – Front Mid-engine / Rear-wheel drive

These cars are RWD cars with the engine placed between the driver and the front axle. 
 Alfa Romeo 8C Competizione
 AC Cobra
 Aston Martin Vantage (2005), (2018), Vanquish, DB7, DB9, DB11, DBS V12, DBS Superleggera, One-77, and Rapide
 BMW Z1, Z8
 Cadillac XLR,  Sixteen
 Chevrolet Corvette (second through seventh generations)
 Chrysler Firepower
 Bill Thomas Cheetah (used only one universal joint between transmission tailshaft housing and differential housing)
 Dodge A100 and Viper
 Ferrari 599 GTB Fiorano, 612 Scaglietti, F12 Berlinetta, 812 Superfast, GTC4Lusso T, California, Portofino, and Roma
Ford Econoline (first generation)
 Honda S2000
 Jaguar E-Type, XK, and F-Type
 Lexus LFA
 Maserati Quattroporte V, GranTurismo/GranCabrio
 Mazda Bongo (second generation), RX-7, MX-5 and RX-8
 Mercedes-Benz SLR McLaren, SLS AMG and AMG GT
 Morgan +4, 4/4, Aero 8, Plus Four, Plus Six and Plus 8
 Nissan 350Z, 370Z, and Z
 Opel GT (original)
 Porsche 924, 944 and 968
 Shelby Daytona
 Toyota Previa (first generation) and 2000GT

 Most pre–World War II front-engine rear-wheel-drive cars

FM4 layout – Front Mid-engine / Four-wheel drive

This layout, similar to the above FMR layout, with the engine between driver and behind the front axle, adds front-wheel drive to become a four-wheel drive.  An engineering challenge with this layout is getting the power to the front wheels past the engine - this would normally involve raising the engine to allow a propshaft to pass under the engine, or in the case of the Ferrari FF taking power from both ends of the crankshaft with two separate gearboxes. 
Toyota Previa All-Trac variant
Ferrari FF/GTC4Lusso
Jensen FF
Hummer H1
Willys MB
 Most early front-engine off-road cars

RMR layout – Rear Mid-engine / Rear-wheel drive

These cars use a traditional engine layout between driver and rear drive axle. Typically, they're simply called MR; for mid-rear (engined), or mid-engine, rear-wheel-drive layout cars.
 Alfa Romeo 4C
 Alpine A110 (2017)
 Apollo Intensa Emozione
 Ariel Atom
 Arrinera Hussarya
 Artega GT
 Aston Martin Valhalla and Valkyrie
 Autozam AZ-1
 BMW M1
 Chevrolet Corvette (C8)
 Consulier GTP
 DC Avanti
 DeTomaso Vallelunga, Mangusta, Pantera, Guara, P72
 Ferrari 308, 328, 348, F355, 360, F430, 458, 488, F8, 296 GTB, Berlinetta Boxer, Mondial, Testarossa, F40, F50, Enzo, FXX, LaFerrari, FXX-K
 Fiat X1/9
 Ford GT and GT40
 Genty Akylone
 Gordon Murray Automotive T.33, T.50
 Ginetta F400, G60
 Gumpert Apollo
 Hennessey Venom GT, Venom F5
 Honda Beat, NSX (NA1/NA2), and S660
 Jaguar XJR-15 and XJ220
 Koenigsegg CC8S, CCR, CCX, Agera, Regera, Jesko
 Lamborghini Miura, Countach, Diablo SV, Jalpa, Silhouette
 Lancia Stratos HF, Montecarlo
 Lotus Europa, Esprit, Elise, Exige, Evora, Emira
 Maserati Merak, Bora, MC12, MC20
 Mastretta MXT
 Matra Djet, 530, Bagheera, Murena
 Mazzanti Evantra
 McLaren F1, MP4-12C, 570S, 650S, 720S, P1, GT, Artura, Senna, Speedtail, Elva
 Mercedes-Benz CLK GTR
 MG F
 Mitsubishi i and i-MiEV (Rear Mid-engine transversely-mounted / Rear-wheel drive)
 Mosler MT900
 Nissan R390 GT1
 Opel Speedster
 Pagani Huayra, Zonda
 Pontiac Fiero
 Porsche 550, 914, Boxster/Cayman, Carrera GT, 911 GT1
 Prince R380
 Renault 5 Turbo, Clio V6 Renault Sport
 Rezvani Beast
 Ruf CTR3
 Ruf RK Coupe/Spyder
 Saleen S7
 Scuderia Cameron Glickenhaus SCG 003, SCG 004
 SIN R1
 Smart Roadster
 SSC Aero, Tuatara
 Toyota MR2/MR-S
 Vencer Sarthe
 Venturi Atlantique
 Volkswagen XL1
 W Motors Lykan HyperSport, Fenyr SuperSport
 Zenvo ST1, TS1 GT

M4 layout – Rear Mid-engine / Four-wheel drive

These cars use mid-ship, four-wheel-drive, with an engine between the axles.

Ares Design Project1
Audi R8
BMW i8
Bugatti EB 110, Veyron, Chiron, Divo, Centodieci
Ford RS200
Ferrari SF90 Stradale
Honda Acty (4WD versions only), NSX (NC1), Z (1998-2002)
Italdesign Zerouno
Koenigsegg Gemera
Lancia Delta S4
Lamborghini Aventador, Centenario, Sián FKP 37, Countach LPI 800-4, Diablo VT series, Gallardo, Murciélago, Reventón, Huracán, Sesto Elemento
Mercedes-AMG ONE
MG Metro 6R4
Panther Solo 2
Peugeot 205 Turbo 16
Porsche 918 Spyder
Volvo L3314
Unimog UGN/405

MF layout – Mid-engine / Front-wheel drive

These cars are "mid-ship engined" vehicles, but they use front-wheel drive, with the engine in front of the driver. It is still treated as an FF layout, though, due to the engine's placement still being in the front of the car, contrary to the popular belief that the engine is placed in front of the rear axle with power transferred to the front wheels (an RMF layout). In most examples, the engine is longitudinally mounted rather than transversely as is common with FF cars.

 BSA Scout
 Citroën Traction Avant, DS, SM
 Nissan GT-R LM Nismo
 Renault 4, 5, 16
 Saab Sonett Mk1
 Honda Vigor/Inspire 1989–1995
 Maserati Quattroporte II

References 

 
Car layouts